Jurijs Rubenis (Russian: Юрий Янович Рубэн, April 15, 1925 – March 14, 2004) was a Latvian communist politician. He was born in Mogilev, Byelorussian SSR. He was a member of the Communist Party of Latvia. He was the penultimate Chairman of the Council of Ministers (head of government) for the Latvian SSR.

External links 
Рубенис Юрий Янович. az-libr.ru.
Рубэн. diclib.com.
Этот день в истории. 15 апреля. subscribe.ru.

1925 births
2004 deaths
People from Mogilev
Members of the Central Committee of the Communist Party of Latvia
Central Committee of the Communist Party of the Soviet Union candidate members
Heads of government of the Latvian Soviet Socialist Republic
Members of the Supreme Soviet of the Latvian Soviet Socialist Republic, 1963–1967
Members of the Supreme Soviet of the Latvian Soviet Socialist Republic, 1967–1971
Members of the Supreme Soviet of the Latvian Soviet Socialist Republic, 1971–1975
Members of the Supreme Soviet of the Latvian Soviet Socialist Republic, 1975–1980
Members of the Supreme Soviet of the Latvian Soviet Socialist Republic, 1980–1985
Members of the Supreme Soviet of the Latvian Soviet Socialist Republic, 1985–1990
Eighth convocation members of the Soviet of Nationalities
Ninth convocation members of the Soviet of the Union
Tenth convocation members of the Soviet of the Union
Eleventh convocation members of the Soviet of the Union
University of Latvia alumni
Soviet military personnel of World War II
Recipients of the Order of Lenin
Recipients of the Order of the Red Banner of Labour